David Gauthier  (born 10 September 1932) is a Canadian-American philosopher best known for his neo-Hobbesian social contract (contractarian) theory of morality, as developed in his 1986 book Morals by Agreement.

Life and career
Gauthier was born in Toronto in 1932 and educated at the University of Toronto (B.A. (Hons.), 1954), Harvard University (A.M., 1955), and the University of Oxford (B.Phil., 1957; D.Phil., 1961).

He taught at the University of Toronto from 1958 until 1980, when he joined the Department of Philosophy at the University of Pittsburgh, where he is now Distinguished Service Professor emeritus.

Gauthier has also held visiting appointments at UCLA, UC Berkeley, Princeton, UC Irvine, and the University of Waterloo.

In 1979, he was elected a fellow of the Royal Society of Canada (F.R.S.C.).

Philosophy
Gauthier is the author of numerous articles, some of the most important of which are collected in Moral Dealing, as well as several books including Practical Reasoning, The Logic of Leviathan, Morals by Agreement, and Rousseau: The Sentiment of Existence.

In addition to systematic work in moral theory, Gauthier is also interested in the history of political philosophy, especially Hobbes and Rousseau. He has also done work on the theory of practical rationality, where he begins from an attempt to understand economic rationality, rather than from Kantian or Aristotelian antecedents.

Gauthier understands value as a matter of individuals' subjective preferences, and argues that moral constraints on straightforward utility-maximizing are prudentially justified. He argues that it is most prudent to give up straightforward maximizing and instead adopt a disposition of constrained maximization, according to which one resolves to cooperate with all similarly disposed persons (those disposed towards cooperation) and defect on the rest (straightforward maximizers), since repeated cooperation provides greater yields than repeated mutual defection from contracts (as is seen in a basic Prisoner's dilemma game). According to Gauthier's contractarian ethics, moral constraints are justified because they make us all better off, in terms of our preferences (whatever they may be). A consequence is that good moral thinking is just an elevated and subtly strategic version of means–end reasoning.

Bibliography
 Practical Reasoning: The Structure and Foundations of Prudential and Moral Arguments and Their Exemplification in Discourse (Oxford: Clarendon Press, 1963).
 The Logic of Leviathan: The Moral and Political Theory of Thomas Hobbes (Oxford: Clarendon Press, 1969).
 Morals by Agreement (Oxford: Oxford University Press, 1986)
 Moral Dealing: Contract, Ethics, and Reason (Ithaca, Cornell University Press, 1990).
 Rousseau: The Sentiment of Existence (Cambridge: Cambridge University Press, 2006).

See also
 American philosophy
 Compliance problem
 Social contract
 Game theory
 List of American philosophers

References

Further reading
 E. F. Paul, F. D. Miller Jr., and J. Paul, eds., The New Social Contract: Essays on Gauthier (Oxford: Blackwell, 1988).
 Peter Vallentyne, ed., Contractarianism and Rational Choice: Essays on David Gauthier's Morals by Agreement (New York: Cambridge University Press, 1991.)
 David Gauthier and Robert Sugden, eds., Rationality, Justice and the Social Contract: Themes from Morals by Agreement (Hertfordshire: Harvester Wheatsheaf, 1993).
 Christopher W. Morris, and Arthur Ripstein, eds., Practical Rationality and Preference: Essays for David Gauthier (New York: Cambridge University Press, 2001)
 John G. Messerly, "Constrained Maximizers in Iterated Contexts," Southwest Philosophy Review, 1994, 107–111.
 John G. Messerly, "The Omission of Unconditional Cooperators: A Critique of Gauthier’s Argument for Constrained Maximization," Philosophical Studies 67, 1992, 19–39.

1932 births
Living people
20th-century American philosophers
21st-century American philosophers
University of Toronto alumni
Harvard University alumni
Alumni of the University of Oxford
Canadian philosophers
Academic staff of the University of Toronto
University of Pittsburgh faculty